Gillian Gowers (born 9 April 1964, in Horfield) is a retired female badminton player from England.

Badminton career

World Championships
She won the bronze medal at the 1985 IBF World Championships in mixed doubles with Nigel Tier.

Olympic Games
Gowers participated in the 1992 Barcelona Summer Olympics for Great Britain.

Commonwealth Games
She represented England and won double gold medal in the team event and the women's doubles with Gillian Clark, at the 1986 Commonwealth Games in Edinburgh, Scotland. She also participated in the singles and mixed doubles.

Four years later she represented England again and won another gold medal in the team event but had to settle for a silver medal in the women's doubles with Clark, at the 1990 Commonwealth Games in Auckland, New Zealand.

Major achievements

References

External links
 
 
 
 
 

English female badminton players
1964 births
Living people
Badminton players at the 1986 Commonwealth Games
Badminton players at the 1990 Commonwealth Games
Commonwealth Games gold medallists for England
Commonwealth Games medallists in badminton
Olympic badminton players of Great Britain
Badminton players at the 1992 Summer Olympics
Medallists at the 1982 Commonwealth Games
Medallists at the 1986 Commonwealth Games